Astroscopus, the electric stargazers, is a genus of stargazers, a type of percomorph fish from the family Uranoscopidae, part of the order Trachiniformes. The species in this genus are anatomically distinct Uranoscopids, being characterized by internal nares and being the only group of marine bony fish having organs which produce electricity which are derived from the extraocular muscles. They are found on the Atlantic and Pacific coasts of the Americas.

Species
There are four extant and one extinct species included in Astroscopus:

 Astroscopus guttatus Abbott, 1860 - Northern stargazer
 Astroscopus sexspinosus (Steindachner, 1876)
 Astroscopus y-graecum, (Cuvier, 1829) - Southern stargazer
 Astroscopus zephyreus Gilbert & Starks in Gilbert, 1897
 †Astroscopus countermani Carnevale, Godfrey & Pietsch, 2011 Extinct species described from the Tortonian deposits of Calvert Cliffs, Maryland.

References

Uranoscopidae